Pseudadelphia is a genus of snout moths in the subfamily Phycitinae.

Selected species
Pseudadelphia ochripunctella (Dyar, 1908)

References

Phycitinae